VG-62 is a sports club based in Naantali, Finland. It was founded in 1962 and the name is an abbreviation of Naantali's old Latin name, "Vallis gratiae".

History
Naantali's VG-62 sports club has several teams in many sports, including the sports of ice hockey, volleyball, football, figure skating and ringette. 

The VG-62 ringette club was founded by Alpo and Jan Lindström near the end of the 1970s. The ringette club eventually went on to compete in Finland's national ringette league, now know as "SM Ringette". VG-62 is the home of the  club.

Ringette
Ringette was introduced to the city of Naantali towards the end of 1979 by a father-son duo, Alpo Lindström and his son, Jan Lindström, after Jan witnessed girls playing the sport while he had been an exchange student in the United States in 1978. Jan created the VG-62 ringette club once he returned to Finland. Alpo served as chairman of the local ringette association, the VG-62 ringette team coach, and sometimes as the team's manager. He was instrumental in establishing Finland's national ringette association in 1983 (Ringette Finland) and later served as a member of the board of the International Ringette Federation (IRF). VG-62 is the home of the  club.

Notable footballers
 Jermu Gustafsson
 Pauno Kymäläinen

See also
 Ringette
 Ringette Finland
 International Ringette Federation

References 

Figure skating clubs
Multi-sport clubs in Finland
Figure skating in Finland
1962 establishments in Finland
Ringette